The COVID-19 pandemic reached the province of Zhejiang, China.

Statistics

Distribution of cases in prefecture-level cities
The following is the distribution of confirmed cases in prefecture-level cities, and the sources of the data are the official websites of prefecture-level cities.

Timeline

2020

2021

2022

2023
On Jan. 9, authorities in Zhejiang province said the province had passed the peak of its first wave of infections.

References

COVID-19 pandemic in China by province
COVID-19 pandemic in mainland China
History of Zhejiang
Health in Zhejiang

zh:2019冠狀病毒病浙江省疫情